Blue Heaven may refer to:
 Blue Heaven (1994 TV series), a British television sitcom
 Blue Heaven (2003 TV series), a Scottish television documentary series
 Blue Heaven (Keenan novel), a 1988 novel by Joe Keenan
 Blue Heaven (Box novel), a 2008 novel by C. J. Box
 "Blue Heaven" (song)
 Blue Heaven (manga), a manga series by Tsutomu Takahashi
Blue Heaven (flavour), Australian dessert topping

See also
My Blue Heaven (disambiguation)